Sappho and Alcaeus is an 1881 oil painting by Lawrence Alma-Tadema.  It is held by the Walters Art Museum, in Baltimore.

The painting measures .  It depicts a concert in the late 7th century BC, with the poet Alcaeus of Mytilene playing the kithara.  In the audience is fellow Lesbian poet Sappho, accompanied by several of her female friends.  Sappho is paying close attention to the performance, resting her arm on a cushion which bears a laurel wreath, presumably intended for the performer. The painting illustrates a passage by the poet Hermesianax, recorded by Athenaeus in his Deipnosophistae ("The Philosophers' Banquet"), book 13, page 598.

The location, with tiers of white marble seating, is based on the Theatre of Dionysus in Athens, but Alma-Tadema has replaced the original inscribed names of Athenians with the names of Sappho's friends.  In the background, the Aegean Sea can be seen through some trees.

The painting was exhibited at the Royal Academy in 1881, and depicted in William Powell Frith's A Private View at the Royal Academy, 1881, to the far right, being inspected by John Everett Millais. It was highly praised by critics: Punch described it as "marbellous".  It was acquired by William Thompson Walters of Baltimore, and on his death in 1894 it was inherited by his son Henry Walters, who left it to the Walters Art Museum on his own death in 1931.

References
 Sappho and Alcaeus, Walters Art Museum
 Sappho and Alcaeus, Google Arts & Culture
 The Artist, 1 June 1881, p. 172.
 William Powell Frith, The Private View, 1881, Christie's, 11 December 2008

1881 paintings
Paintings in the collection of the Walters Art Museum
Paintings by Lawrence Alma-Tadema
Musical instruments in art
Cultural depictions of Sappho